Bernadette Sands McKevitt (born in November 1958) is an Irish republican, and a founding member of the 32 County Sovereignty Movement.

Early life

She lived in the mainly loyalist Rathcoole area of Newtownabbey before her family were forced out of their home, when they moved to republican West Belfast. She is the younger sister of Provisional Irish Republican Army (IRA) hunger striker Bobby Sands.

Personal life
Her husband was Michael McKevitt, the Quartermaster General of the Provisional IRA and later a founding member of an anti-Good Friday Agreement splinter group commonly known as the Real Irish Republican Army. The couple had three children together and lived in Dundalk in the Republic of Ireland.

Following the Omagh bombing, Sands McKevitt received hostile messages while running her t-shirt printing business in Dundalk, which traumatised her and led to her calling a local priest. The locals forced her and her husband out of the business, though both of them strongly denied having anything to do with the attack in Omagh (in June 2009, McKevitt was one of four men found by a civil court to be liable for the bombing in a case taken by relatives of the victims). In March 2001, McKevitt and her husband were arrested by the Gardaí in Dundalk in a paramilitary investigation, but were not charged. In 2003, McKevitt was sentenced to twenty years in prison in the Republic of Ireland, under the Offences Against the State Act, being released early in 2016. He died in January 2021 after a long battle with cancer.

References

1958 births
Irish republicans
Living people
People from Newtownabbey
Real Irish Republican Army